Gülçavuş is a village in the Enez District of Edirne Province in Turkey. The village is 152 km from Edirne city center and 18 km from Enez district center.

References

Villages in Enez District